This article details the qualifying phase for karate at the 2020 Summer Olympics . 80 quota places for the Games are entitled to the karatekas coming from their respective NOCs, based on the results at designated tournaments supervised by World Karate Federation. Each NOC could enter a maximum of eight karatekas (one in each division). Host nation Japan has reserved a spot in each of all 8 events, while four are made available to NOCs through a Tripartite Commission Invitation.

Qualifying standards
The 10 competitors in each event qualify as follows:
 1 from the host nation, Japan
 4 from the Olympic Standing ranking of 5 April 2021
 3 from the Olympics Karate 2020 Qualification Tournament
 2 from continental representation or Tripartite Commission invitation

Because the World Karate Federation rankings are based on five weight classes instead of the three weight classes featured in the 2020 Olympics, some of the Olympic events are based on a combination of two WKF classes. In those cases, the top 2 from each of the WKF classes qualify for the combined Olympic class (for a total of 4). Where the Olympic class matches the WKF class, the top 4 in that class qualify.

The qualification tournament features the same weight classes as the Olympic weight classes. Only NOCs that have not qualified through Olympic standing for a given division are eligible to enter an athlete in the qualification tournament. The top three finishers in each division at the qualification tournament qualify for the Olympics.

A total of 12 quota places, distributed among the eight events, are available through continental representation. The selection order is as follows:
 Oceania, 2 spots (1 per gender)
 Africa, 2 spots (1 per gender)
 Americas, 2 spots (1 per gender)
 Asia, 2 spots (1 per gender)
 Europe, 2 spots (1 per gender)
 Africa, 1 spot (either gender)
 Americas, 1 spot (the other gender)

For each continent, all of the gold medalists at the continental games are considered together. The highest-ranked among this group earns the qualification spot unless that competitor is already qualified or otherwise cannot be selected without violating any of the following limitations: 10 athletes per division, 1 athlete per NOC per division, 2 athletes per NOC through continental representation (affecting only Africa and the Americas). If the highest-ranked gold medalist cannot be entered, then the next-highest ranked gold medalist qualifies if possible. This process goes through all gold medalists by ranking, then all silver medalists by ranking, then all bronze medalists by ranking until the continent's qualifying spots are filled. If none of the medalists can be entered, the highest-ranked eligible athlete from that continent in the rankings (regardless of finish at the continental games) qualifies.

The final four quota spots will be assigned through Tripartite Commission invitation.

Timeline

Qualification summary

Men's events

67 kg

75 kg

+75 kg

Kata

Women's events

55 kg

61 kg

+61 kg

Kata

References

Qualification for the 2020 Summer Olympics
Qualification